Reza Rasouli (born 1898 in Tabriz — death ?) was an Iranian Azerbaijani politician. By Ja'far Pishevari with the formation Azerbaijan People's Government in 1945, was Trade and Economy Minister of Azerbaijan's Government in the Ja'far Pishevari Cabinet. Before the establishment of government he was employee in the Ministry of Interior (Pahlavi dynasty).

Notes

References
 *
 آذربايجان دموکرات فرقه سي Monthly magazine of Baharistan 

People from Tabriz
1898 births
Azerbaijani Democratic Party politicians
Year of death missing